The 2003–04 season of the División de Honor de Futsal is the 15th season of top-tier futsal in Spain.

Regular season

League table

Playoffs

Championships playoffs

Relegation playoff

 LookFind Alcalá Carnicer remained in División de Honor.

Goalscorers

See also
División de Honor de Futsal
Futsal in Spain

External links
2003–04 season at lnfs.es

2003 04
Spain
futsal